Gamelan selunding (also spelled selonding) is a sacred ensemble of gamelan music from Bali, Indonesia. The selunding ensemble is from Tenganan, a village in east Bali; the ensemble is rare. Selunding means "great" or "large". Selonding is also a musical instrument made of iron.

See also

 Gamelan
 Beleganjur
 Gong kebyar

References

Music of Bali
Gamelan ensembles and genres